California's 41st State Assembly district is one of 80 California State Assembly districts. It is currently represented by Democrat Chris Holden of Pasadena.

District profile 
The district encompasses most of the San Gabriel Mountains and various foothill communities. The district is anchored by Pasadena, its largest and westernmost city.

Los Angeles County – 3.7%
 Altadena
 Claremont
 East Pasadena
 La Cañada Flintridge
 La Verne
 Monrovia – 99.3%
 Pasadena
 San Dimas
 Sierra Madre
 

San Bernardino County – 4.8%
 Rancho Cucamonga – 12.3%
 San Antonio Heights
 Upland

Election results from statewide races

List of Assembly Members
Due to redistricting, the 41st district has been moved around different parts of the state. The current iteration resulted from the 2011 redistricting by the California Citizens Redistricting Commission.

Election results 1992 - present

2020

2018

2016

2014

2012

2010

2008

2006

2004

2002

2000

1998

1996

1994

1992

See also 
 California State Assembly
 California State Assembly districts
 Districts in California

References

External links 
 District map from the California Citizens Redistricting Commission

41
Government of Los Angeles County, California
Government of San Bernardino County, California
San Gabriel Mountains
San Gabriel Valley
Altadena, California
Claremont, California
La Verne, California
Monrovia, California
Pasadena, California
Rancho Cucamonga, California
San Dimas, California
Sierra Madre, California
South Pasadena, California
Upland, California